The pecan weevil, Curculio caryae (Coleoptera: Curculionidae) is an obligate feeder on the nuts of North American hickories and pecans (Carya species), most widely recognized as an economically important pest of the pecan, Carya illinoinensis (Fagales: Juglandaceae). It has also been observed to infest one Juglans species, the Persian walnut, Juglans regia.

In late fall and early winter, mature larvae chew a small hole in the nut shell and drop to the ground, where they burrow into the soil and construct a cell in which they remain for eight to ten months before pupating and transforming into adults. Newly formed adults remain in their cells in the soil and emerge the following year, two years after the beginning of the cycle, although some larvae do not pupate and transform to adults until an additional year has passed and the life cycle for some of each generation may take up to three years.

Their economic importance results from crop loss due to their feeding and egg laying on the developing pecan nuts causing them to drop from the tree, and the destruction of the edible nut kernel by the larvae feeding inside the shell.

References

Curculioninae
Beetles of North America
Beetles described in 1873
Taxa named by George Henry Horn